Poe is a surname commonly found in the United States. The most famous bearer of the name was American writer Edgar Allan Poe (1809–1849), the grandson of an immigrant from County Cavan, Ireland. The name has also been used as an Anglicization of the German surname Pfau and of the Catalan surname Pou.

Poe or Poé may refer to:

People
Alexander Poe (born 1974), United States Virgin Islands bobsledder
Amos Poe (born 1949), American film director
Andrew Jackson Poe (1851–1920), American painter
Andy Poe (1943–1995), Filipino actor
Art Poe (1879–1951), American football player and businessman
Billy Poe (born 1964), American football player
Bob Poe (born 1954), American politician and businessman
Bobby Poe ( The Poe Kat; 1933–2011), American vocalist and guitarist
Bonnie Poe (1912–1993), American actor and voice artist
Brian Poe (born 1992), American journalist
Bryce Poe II (1924–2000), American air force general
Clarence Hamilton Poe (1881–1964), American editor, author, and Progressive-Era reformer
Conrad Poe (1948–2010), Filipino actor
David Poe Jr. (1784–1811), American actor; father of writer Edgar Allan Poe
Dontari Poe (born 1980), American football player
Ebenezer W. Poe (1846–1898), American politician
Edgar Allan Poe (1809–1849), American writer, poet, editor, and literary critic
Edgar Allan Poe (attorney general) (1871–1961), attorney general
Edgar Allen Poe Newcomb (1846–1923), Architect and music composer
Eliza Poe (née Arnold, 1787–1811), British actress; mother of writer Edgar Allan Poe
Fernando Poe Jr. (1939–2004), Filipino actor, film director, and politician
Fernando Poe Sr. (1916–1951), Filipino actor
George Poe (1846–1914), American chemist
Gertrude Poe (1915–2017), American journalist and lawyer
Gina R. Poe (born ?), American neuroscientist and sleep researcher
Grace Poe (born 1968), Filipina politician
Gresham Poe (1880–1956), American football player and coach
Harry Lee Poe (born ?), American author and Edgar Allan Poe scholar
Heather Poe (born ?), wife of Mary Cheney
James Poe (1921–1980), American film and television screenwriter
Jean Morel Poé (born 1996), Ivorian footballer
Jesse Poe (born 1975), American singer and songwriter
John Poe (disambiguation), several people
Kay Poe (born 1982), American taekwondo practitioner and Olympics competitor
Lauren Poe (born 1970/71), American politician
Lavinia Marian Fleming Poe (1890–1974), American lawyer; first African-American female lawyer in Virginia
Lovi Poe (born 1989), Filipino actor, model, and recording artist
Lugné-Poe (1869–1940), French actor and director
Marshall Poe (born 1961), American historian, educator, writer, and editor
Michelle Poe (born ?), American guitarist, member of the band Burns & Poe
Neilson Poe (1809–1884), American judge
Neilson Poe (American football) (1876–1963), American football player and WWI soldier
Orlando Metcalfe Poe (1832–1895), American Civil War army officer and engineer
Raymond Poe (born 1944), American politician
Richard Poe (born 1946), American actor
Ron Poe (born 1942), American football coach
Samuel Poe (1882–1884), American football player
Ted Poe (born 1948), American politician, lawyer, and judge
Tef Poe ( Kareem Jackson; born 1983), American rapper
Tony Poe ( Anthony Poshepny; 1924–2003), American paramilitary operations officer
Virginia Eliza Clemm Poe (1822–1847), wife and first cousin of Edgar Allan Poe
Washington Poe (1800–1876), American politician and lawyer
Wilford B. Poe (born 1937), American academic
William F. Poe (1931–2014), American politician and businessman
William Henry Leonard Poe (1807–1831), American sailor and poet

In fiction
Albert Poe, character in Daniel Handler’s A Series of Unfortunate Events novels
Arthur Poe, main character in Daniel Handler’s A Series of Unfortunate Events novels
Cameron Poe, lead role in the 1998 American film Con Air
Edgar Poe, character in Daniel Handler’s A Series of Unfortunate Events novels
Eleanora Poe, character in Daniel Handler’s A Series of Unfortunate Events novels
Eleanore Poe, character in Daniel Handler’s A Series of Unfortunate Events novels
Everett Poe, role in eponymously-titled 2007 episode of the television show Nip/Tuck
Phineas Poe, lead character in the Phineas Poe (2005) novella collection by Will Christopher Baer
Poe Dameron, from the Star Wars film franchise

See also
Hoe-poe-kaw ( Glory of the Morning; died 1832), Ho-Chunk Chief
Percy Poe Bishop (1877–1967), American major general
Poe Ballantine ( Edwin Hughes; born 1955), American novelist and essayist
Poe brothers, six American football players who played at Princeton University
Poe Ei Ei Khant (born 1993), Burmese actress and singer
Poe Kyar Phyu Khin (born 1992), Burmese actor and model
Poe Mi (born 1988), Burmese singer-songwriter
Poe (singer) ( Anne Decatur Danielewski; born 1967), American singer, songwriter, and record producer
Poe Toasters, people who anonymously pay tribute to Edgar Allan Poe on the anniversary of Poe’s birthday
Saw Mutu Say Poe (born ?), Karen army general

English-language surnames